Wayne Kierans is a Gaelic football manager.

He is interested in association football and likes Liverpool and was a selector under Pete McGrath.

An O'Connell's clubman, he made it known he wanted the Louth manager job in 2018 and he was the first one interviewed for it.

He coached Louth to a first Leinster Minor Football Championship final in 46 years in 2017, in the second of his two seasons in charge before taking over the under-20 team in 2018. The Castlebellingham man is based in Dublin and has a young family. "I'm lucky that I've great support at home with herself. She's very supportive of what I want to do and understands that I'm pretty obsessed with the game".

His time with Louth came to an end in 2020.

Club management saw him bring Naomh Fionnbarra a Junior Championship in 2015, O'Connell's towards the end of the season he left Louth and then 2022 appointed manager of Killeavy.

References

Gaelic football managers
Gaelic football selectors
Year of birth missing (living people)
Living people